Connie Chen (born 26 October 1992) is a South African professional golfer who has played on the Ladies European Tour. She won the 2014 Open De España Femenino, which was her first title on the tour.

Career
Chen started playing golf at the age of ten, and first represented South Africa aged 15 at the 2008 Junior Open Championship. She continued her junior international career by playing for South Africa at the Annika Invitational and The British Girls Championship in 2009 and 2010, and then The Duke of York Invitational in 2010. She won over 10 events in 2010 and was the youngest member of South Africa's World Amateur Team, helping the team to a bronze medal. Based on her achievements, she was awarded the 2010 Compleat Golfer South African Woman Golfer of the Year award by the Women's Golf South African Association (WGSA). After her 18th birthday, she turned professional and qualified for the 2011 Ladies European Tour season. Chen made a hole in one at the 2013 Omega Dubai Ladies Masters and walked away with a Mercedes Benz Convertible. The following year she had her maiden win on the Ladies European Tour when she won the Open de España Femenino in Tenerife, Spain. At the end of 2014, Chen started her PGA studies and became a full member of the PGA UK&I in early 2018. In 2020 Chen was featured as one of Golf Digest's Top 75 Best International Teachers. She has been playing on the Chinese LPGA tour over the past several seasons while also coaching around the world.

Ladies European Tour wins
2014 Open de España Femenino

Team appearances
Amateur
Espirito Santo Trophy (representing South Africa): 2010

Awards and other recognition
 Compleat Golfer South African Woman Golfer of the Year award 2010
 Golf Digest Top 75 International Coach 2020

References

External links

South African female golfers
Ladies European Tour golfers
Sportspeople from Pretoria
1992 births
Living people